, or, ″the Eastern Monastery of the Original Vow″, is one of two dominant sub-sects of Shin Buddhism in Japan and abroad, the other being Nishi Honganji (or, 'The Western Temple of the Original Vow'). It is also the name of the head temple of the Ōtani-ha branch of Jōdo Shinshū in Kyoto, which was most recently constructed in 1895 after a fire burned down the previous temple.

History 

Higashi Honganji was established in 1602 by the shōgun Tokugawa Ieyasu when he split the Shin sect in two (Nishi Honganji being the other) in order to diminish its power. The temple was first built in its present location in 1658.

The temple grounds feature a mausoleum containing the ashes of Shin Buddhism founder Shinran. The mausoleum was initially constructed in 1272 and moved several times before being constructed in its current location in 1670.

At the center of the temple is the Founder's Hall, where an image of the temple's founder, Shinran, is enshrined. The hall is one of the largest wooden structures in the world at 76 m (250 ft.) in length, 58 m (190 ft.) in width, and 38 m (125 ft.) in height. The current hall was constructed in 1895.

The Amida Hall to the left of the Founder's Hall contains an image of Amida Buddha along with an image of Prince Shōtoku, who introduced Buddhism to Japan. The hall is ornately decorated with gold leaf and art from the JapaneseMeiji Period. The current hall was constructed in 1895.

Various parts of Higashi Honganji, including the Founder's Hall and Amida Hall, burned down 4 times during the Japanese Edo Period. Monetary assistance was often given to Higashi Honganji by the Tokugawa Shogunate in order to rebuild. The Great Tenmei Fire in Kyoto caused many temple buildings to burn down in 1788, and the temple was rebuilt in 1797. An accidental fire destroyed many of the temple buildings in 1823 and were rebuilt in 1835. After burning down once again in 1858, the destroyed halls were quickly and temporarily reconstructed for Shinran's 600th Memorial Service in 1861. However, these temporary hall burned down in a city-wide fire caused by the Kinmon incident on July 19, 1864. The temple finally started to rebuild in 1879 after the fall of the Tokugawa Shogunate and once conflict caused by the Meiji Restoration of 1868 had settled down. The Founder's Hall and Amida Hall were completed in 1895, with other buildings being restored by 1911. These buildings comprise the current temple.

During the twentieth century, Higashi Honganji was troubled by political disagreements, financial scandals and family disputes, and has subsequently fractured into a number of further sub-divisions (see Ohigashi schism).  The largest Higashi Honganji grouping, the Shinshu Otaniha has approximately 5.5 million members, according to statistics.  However within this climate of instability the Higashi Honganji also produced a significant number of extremely influential thinkers, such as Soga Ryojin, Kiyozawa Manshi, Kaneko Daiei and Haya Akegarasu amongst others.

See also 

 Glossary of Japanese Buddhism
 Shinran
 Ōtani-ha
 Pure Land Buddhism
 Shin Buddhism

References

1602 establishments in Japan
Jōdo Shin temples
Monzeki
Pure Land temples
Religious organizations established in 1602